Dundrod is a small village and townland in County Antrim, Northern Ireland. In the 2001 Census it had a population of 167 people. It is within the Lisburn City Council area.

Buildings

Sport 
Dundrod Circuit is the location to Dundrod Motorcycle Road Racing Circuit. The circuit is seven miles and 505 yards long. The Ulster Grand Prix and the Dundrod 150 races are held here.

References 

NI Neighbourhood Information System
Dundrod Circuit
Draft Belfast Metropolitan Area Plan 2015

External links 
Real Road Racing - Dundrod

Villages in County Antrim